Nagaho Chishi (born 12 November 1997) is an Indian cricketer who represents Nagaland in domestic cricket. He made his List A debut on 2 October 2019, for Nagaland in the 2019–20 Vijay Hazare Trophy. He made his Twenty20 debut on 8 November 2019, for Nagaland in the 2019–20 Syed Mushtaq Ali Trophy. He made his first-class debut on 9 December 2019, for Nagaland in the 2019–20 Ranji Trophy.

References

External links
 

1997 births
Living people
Indian cricketers
Nagaland cricketers
Place of birth missing (living people)